ISDB may refer to:

 Integrated Services Digital Broadcasting (ISDB)
 International Society of Developmental Biologists
 Islamic Development Bank (IsDB)
 International Society of Drug Bulletins